The Catholic Church in Qatar is part of the worldwide Catholic Church, under the spiritual leadership of the Pope in Rome.

History
thumb|right|200px|Catholic Church of Our Lady of the Rosary (Doha).
There are 200,000 Catholics in Qatar, most of whom are expatriate workers from the Philippines, Lebanon, India, South America and the United Kingdom. Qatar forms part of the Apostolic Vicariate of Northern Arabia. Our Lady of the Rosary, the first Catholic church in Qatar, and also the first in an Arab Muslim emirate, was dedicated in the capital, Doha, on March 14, 2008. The church cost $15 million to build and received contributions from Catholics throughout the Arabian Peninsula. Previously, Catholics and other Christians were limited to informal group meetings in homes. There are two Eastern Catholic Churches, St. Mary’s Malankara Catholic Church and St. Thomas Syro-Malabar Church.

See also
 Christianity in Qatar
 Protestantism in Qatar

References

 
Qatar
Qatar
Apostolic Vicariate of Northern Arabia